Sucrononic acid is a guanidine derivative artificial sweetener.  It is one of the most potent sweeteners known, with a sweetness 200,000 times that of sucrose (table sugar).

It has not been approved for use in food.

Sucrononic acid is an artificial compound which is part of the family of guanilic acids, guanidines combined with acetic acid, which are very sweet:
Lugduname (230,000x at equivalent concentration)
Carrelame (200,000x at equivalent concentration)
Bernardame (188,000x at equivalent concentration)
Sucrooctate (162,000x at equivalent concentration)

See also
 C19H26N4O2

References

External links

Sugar substitutes
Guanidines
Nitriles
Zwitterions